December is a 2008 Brazilian drama film and directoral debut of Selton Mello. Shot in Rio de Janeiro, it stars Leonardo Medeiros, Darlene Glória, Graziella Moretto, Paulo Guarnieri, and Lúcio Mauro.

Plot
Caio (Leonardo Medeiros) travels to his hometown to visit his family on Christmas Eve. At the reunion, he must deal with past memories.

From start, the film exposes a structural functioning: it is an example of a "performance cinema".

Cast 
Leonardo Medeiros as Caio
Darlene Glória as Mérci
Graziella Moretto as Fabiana
Paulo Guarnieri as Theo
Lúcio Mauro as Miguel
Fabricio Reis as Bruno
Thelmo Fernandes as Neto
Cláudio Mendes	 as Thales
Daniel Torres as Vitor
Rose Abdallah as Célia
Lucas Guarnieri as Thiago
Liz Maggini Seraphin as Bia
Hossein Minussi as Alex
Emiliano Queiroz as Zé do Caixão
Nathalia Dill as Marília

See also
 List of Christmas films

References

External links
 

2000s Christmas drama films
2008 films
Brazilian Christmas drama films
Films directed by Selton Mello
Films shot in Rio de Janeiro (city)
2000s Portuguese-language films
2008 directorial debut films
2008 drama films